The Musée Culturel du Mont-Carmel (Cultural Museum of Mont-Carmel) is a museum of local history on United States Route 1 in Grand Isle, Maine.  It is located in the former Our Lady of Mount Carmel Catholic Church, one of the only surviving 19th-century Acadian churches in northern Maine.  The architecturally distinctive building was listed on the National Register of Historic Places in 1973.

Architecture and building history
The museum is located on the south side of United States Route 1 in the rural village center of Grand Isle.  A former church, it is a large wood-frame structure with a basically rectangular footprint, extended to the rear by additions.  The main section of the building has a steeply pitched gable roof with a clerestory top.  The building's most interesting features are found on the complex facade, which projects from the main section, and is divided into three sections.  The outer sections are identical square towers, which rise two full stories to an open belfry supported by an arcade of eight Corinthian columns, which support a Baroque dome.  The central section has three double-door entries, each surmounted with a half-round window, and topped by a gable at the first floor level.  Most of the building's windows are narrow with round-arch topps, and consist of paired round-arch sections with a circular motif at the top.

The upper Saint John River valley was settled by Acadians in the early decades of the 19th century, before the border between Maine and New Brunswick was fixed.  When the border was set by the 1842 Webster-Ashburton Treaty, the river became the border in this region, dividing the community.  Acadians on the south side petitioned the Roman Catholic Diocese of Fredericton for their own church, which was built in 1848.  In 1870 the parish was transferred to the Diocese of Portland.  It was built in 1910 by Léonide Gagné, and its ancient Roman basilica interior was designed by Théophile Daoust.

Due to high maintenance costs, the church was closed in 1978.  Legal action following the closure prevented either its maintenance or rehabilitation until 1983.  The following year a non-profit was established, which acquired the building from the diocese, and has since carefully restored it.

Museum
The former church now houses a collection of artifacts related to the Acadian history of the area, and is the site of cultural events.  It is open to the public between June 15 and Labor Day.

See also
National Register of Historic Places listings in Aroostook County, Maine

References

External links
Musée Culturel du Mont-Carmel web site

Acadian diaspora
Churches on the National Register of Historic Places in Maine
Churches completed in 1893
Buildings and structures in Aroostook County, Maine
Museums in Aroostook County, Maine
French-Canadian culture in Maine
History museums in Maine
Religious museums in Maine
National Register of Historic Places in Aroostook County, Maine